Arthur James Conry Booth (1892–1926) was an Irish cartoonist and one of the founders of the satirical magazine Dublin Opinion. Born in Dublin, he was educated at the Catholic University School and joined the Dublin United Transport Company. Through his interest in amateur dramatics, he met fellow cartoonist Charles E. Kelly and writer Thomas J. Collins, and decided to start a humorous journal. Booth resigned his job to become editor, and drew the covers as well as interior cartoons.

Dublin Opinion was launched on 1 March 1922, on the eve of the Irish Civil War, and within four years it was selling 40,000 per issue. Booths cartoons tended to be sombre, concentrating on the destruction caused by the Civil War and the unemployment that followed. He died of pneumonia at the age of 33, leaving a widow and three children. Thereafter, Kelly and Collins became joint editors of Dublin Opinion.

References

1892 births
1926 deaths
Deaths from pneumonia in the Republic of Ireland
Irish editorial cartoonists
People educated at Catholic University School
Irish magazine editors